The 2005 Micronesian Championships in Athletics took place between December 14–15, 2005. The event was held at the Oleai Sports Complex in Saipan, Northern Mariana Islands.  Detailed reports were given for the OAA.

Medal summary
Medal winners and their results were published on the Athletics Weekly webpage.  Complete results can be found on the Oceania Athletics Association webpage.

Men

Women

Mixed

Medal table (unofficial)

References

Micronesian Championships in Athletics
Athletics in the Northern Mariana Islands
2005 in athletics (track and field)
International sports competitions hosted by the Northern Mariana Islands
2005 in Northern Mariana Islands sports
December 2005 sports events in Oceania